Moussa Sory (born 20 May 1988) is a Burkinabé international footballer who plays for AJEB Bobo-Dioulasso, as a defender.

Career
Born in Banfora, he has played club football for US de la Comoé, RC Bobo Dioulasso and AJEB Bobo-Dioulasso.

He made his international debut for Burkina Faso in 2018.

References

1988 births
Living people
Burkinabé footballers
Burkina Faso international footballers
US de la Comoé players
RC Bobo Dioulasso players
Association football defenders
21st-century Burkinabé people
Burkina Faso A' international footballers
2018 African Nations Championship players